Alpha Upsilon Alpha (or ) is an academic honor society recognizing excellence in reading and language arts at the undergraduate and graduate level.  Founded in 1985, it is governed by the International Literacy Association (ILA)

Mission
The mission of the society is to "recognize and encourage scholarship, the development of personal and professional leadership, and service to the field of reading" among its chapters.

Membership

There are five different categories of membership in Alpha Upsilon Alpha: Undergraduate, graduate, faculty, professional, and honorary.
To be an undergraduate member, an applicant must have finished 5 semesters or 76 credit hours of undergraduate work and be in the top 25% of their class.  This would typically put all undergraduate applicants at the third-year level; however, students at two-year community colleges, such as West Virginia University - Parkersburg, are able to join.  Applicants must also be recommended by a professor in the field of reading or language arts after completing at least one course in that area.
To be a graduate member, applicants must major in reading or language arts, be recommended by faculty, finish at least 9 credit hours, and carry a 3.5 GPA or higher after completing at least half of their graduate coursework.
To be a faculty member, applicants need to be significantly active (or have been) in reading or language arts as an academic subject and either have 1) a doctoral degree or 2) met the graduate-level membership GPA requirement during their Master's work.
Professional members, such as elementary and secondary school teachers must be voted upon by the chapter they are seeking to join and also meet the requirements for the highest of the above categories that would apply to them.
Honorary members can be selected by the individual chapters upon voting.
All applicants, regardless of level, must be members of the IRA.

Symbols
Like many honor societies, it selected its name based on significance attached to particulars letters of the Greek alphabet.  The first Α stands for Anagnosis, meaning "reading"; the Υ stands for Upotrophia, meaning "scholarship"; and the second Α stands for Archon, meaning "leadership."

Alpha Upsilon Alpha's motto is the Horace quote "Lege sapere aude," which translates as "Read, dare to be wise."

Chapters
Adelphi University – Beta Theta
Arizona State University – Beta Beta
Boston College – Omicron
Buffalo State College – Alpha Iota
Canisius College – Beta Nu
Central Connecticut State University – Beta Kappa
Chicago State University – Rho
Dowling College – Alpha Beta
Fayetteville State University – Alpha Sigma
Florida Memorial University – Beta Rho
Fordham University – Beta Iota
Framingham State University – Alpha Pi
Georgia State University – Alpha Gamma
Governors State University – Alpha Omega
Hofstra University – Alpha Delta Alpha
Holy Family University – Beta Epsilon
Lock Haven University – Beta Lambda
Loyola University Chicago – Pi
Minnesota State University Moorhead – Alpha Tau
Monmouth University – Beta Pi
Murray State University – Eta
New Jersey City University – Delta
North Greenville University – Beta Delta
Northeastern Illinois University – Beta Omicron
Northern Illinois University – Alpha Delta
Philippine Normal University – Alpha Upsilon
Providence College – Alpha Xi
Purdue University – Alpha Kappa
Purdue University Calumet – Beta Gamma
Queens College – Beta Sigma
Roosevelt University – Tau
St. Joseph's University – Alpha Zeta
Saint Xavier University – Zeta
Southern Utah University – Beta Alpha
Troy University at Dothan – Alpha Lambda
University of Georgia – Xi
University of Illinois at Urbana–Champaign – Beta Eta
University of Nebraska at Omaha – Alpha Eta
University of Northern Iowa – Alpha
University of South Carolina Upstate – Beta Xi
University of Wisconsin–Whitewater – Alpha Theta
Weber State University – Beta Zeta
West Chester University – Epsilon
West Virginia University at Parkersburg – Alpha Chi
Widener University – Alpha Psi
Winona State University-Rochester – Alpha Mu
Worcester State College – Beta Mu

References

External links
 Alpha Upsilon Alpha
 International Reading Association

Honor societies
Student organizations established in 1985
1985 establishments in the United States